The Reserve Vineyards & Golf Club is a 36-hole private and public golf club in the northwest United States, located near Hillsboro, Oregon, a suburb west of Portland.

The award-winning club in Washington County opened  in 1997 and hosted the PGA Tour Champions major, The Tradition from 2003 to 2006. It also was the site of the Fred Meyer Challenge from 1998 through 2002. Home to a pair of 18-hole courses, the club is south of Tualatin Valley Highway, east of Hillsboro.

History
Development of The Reserve began in 1991 and involved Tom Kite and Bob Cupp’s golf course development company. However, financing fell through and the company backed out. Eventually the $25 million project received financing from a Korean businessman with OB Sports developing the course with John Fought. The club opened in September 1997 with D.S. Parklane Development as the owner.

From 1998 to 2002, the club was host to the annual Fred Meyer Challenge, run by Portland tour professional Peter Jacobsen. From 2003 to 2006, The Reserve hosted the Champions Tour's JELD-WEN Tradition. That tournament had been held in Arizona at the Cochise Golf Course of the Golf Club at Desert Mountain in Scottsdale, and then moved to Central Oregon and the Crosswater Golf Club at Sunriver after its four-year run at  It moved to Alabama in 2011 and is played in the spring.

Facility
It is across the Tualatin River from Meriwether National Golf Course. When it first opened in 1997, memberships at this private and public course cost $15,000. The two 18-hole courses are rotated between being public and private daily. The wine-themed club has both a pro shop and restaurant, the Vintage Room, at the clubhouse and its own wine label.

Courses

It also includes a  green used for three holes. This course features rolling mounds and green surrounds with short-grass.

References

External links 

Picture of the Cupp course

Golf clubs and courses in Oregon
Sports venues in Hillsboro, Oregon
Golf clubs and courses designed by John Fought
1997 establishments in Oregon
Sports venues completed in 1997
Golf clubs and courses designed by Robert E. Cupp